St Mary's Star of the Sea Catholic School is an Independent co-educational primary and secondary day school, located in Carnarvon, a coastal town located in the Gascoyne region of Western Australia, approximately  north of Perth.

St Mary's has a current enrolment of approximately 300 students from Year K to Year 10. The school's students come from Carnarvon itself or the surrounding areas and the school involves itself in many of the sporting and community activities in Carnarvon. There are approximately forty staff members at the school. Subsidised accommodation and other financial incentives are offered through the Catholic Education Office's Remote Area Package for Teachers.

History

St Mary's Catholic School was founded in 1906 by Mother Joseph O'Connell of the Presentation Sisters. The last remaining Presentation Sisters to live at the school were Sister Delores and Sister Evangelist; they left the school on its centenary on 17 March 2006.

Primary school
St Mary Star of the Sea Primary School is co-educational and caters for approximately 300 students from Kindergarten through to Year 7.  The school has strong links to the Parish and wider communities and their involvement and support are essential.

The Curriculum reflects the values of both the Catholic Church and those outlined in the Curriculum Framework.  The school believes it develops the "whole child" (spiritually, intellectually, socially, emotionally and physically) in an environment rich in the Catholic tradition.

Early childhood education

Kindy, Pre-Primary and Year 1 are educated in the Junior Learning Centre, located across the oval from the main school buildings.  Inside, there are three separate classrooms, with two large ‘wet' areas and a modern kitchen facility.  The play area is fully fenced and the whole centre is fully resourced. Kindy students attend four sessions a week.  Pre-Primary builds upon the knowledge and skills introduced in the previous year.  Students attend full time and are actively involved in investigating, exploring, thinking and communicating.  Each student is individually monitored and assessed and a report is written twice a year.  Year One is a fundamental stage in the young students' learning career. It is the beginning of their formal schooling environment.  Year One, therefore, immerses the students in experiences that are meaningful, whole and based on real situations that the students can relate to.  Such experiences promote language enhancement, cognitive development, social interaction, physical activity and creativity.  Literacy, numeracy and effective communication become a focus.

Year 2–7

The curriculum is more formal and the focus on literacy and numeracy strengthens, while developing the "whole student". The school offers educational programs for individual differences, interests, needs and levels of ability, which it believes sets the student up for future success.  The school offers its students access to a range of specialist learning areas such as Science, Art, Music, Computing and Physical Education.  Students have access to a state of the art computer laboratory whilst having computers in each classroom.

RAISe (Literacy Initiative)

In 2006, St Mary's Primary School continued with its implementation of the RAISe literacy initiative. RAISe stands for Raising Achievement in Schools and this is the school's second year of operation.  "We here at St Mary's continue to endeavour to provide a better and more rounded education for our students."

Middle school
The Middle School of St Mary's Carnarvon was established in 2001 and is dedicated to providing students in Years 8 - 10 with the necessary skills to meet the challenges of the 21st century with faith and hope.  The philosophy behind Middle Schooling at St Mary's is to recognise the challenges associated with the transition that young people experience as they move from being young children to becoming adolescents.  At St Mary's, middle schooling methodologies are adopted to ease this period transition, and to ensure that St Mary's maximises the learning opportunities for all students.

Both the academic and Religious Education programs promote the development of reflection, personal commitment, self-respect and individual achievement within, and outside the school. Programs such as Christian Service Learning, Young Achievement Australia, musical performances, drama productions and a multitude of other activities contribute to the development of each student.

Middle School at St Mary's focuses on meeting student needs, in an environment that provides mutual respect and support, for both the community and the individual within the community. Positive affirming classrooms are developed in conjunction with all members of the school community.

House system

Principals

The following individuals has served as principal of St Mary's Star of the Sea School:

See also
 
List of schools in rural Western Australia
Catholic education in Australia

References

External links
 
 

Catholic secondary schools in Western Australia
Educational institutions established in 1906
1906 establishments in Australia
Presentation Sisters schools
Shire of Carnarvon
Catholic primary schools in Western Australia